WMXW (103.3 MHz) is a commercial FM radio station licensed to Vestal, New York, United States, serving the Binghamton metropolitan area. The station airs an adult contemporary radio format, switching to Christmas music for much of November and December.  It is owned by iHeartMedia, with studios on North Jensen Road in Vestal.  The syndicated Valentine in the Morning show from co-owned KBIG Los Angeles is heard in morning drive time, with Delilah airing on weeknights and Ellen K on Saturday mornings.

WMXW has an effective radiated power (ERP) of 520 watts.  The transmitter is off Ingraham Hill Road in Binghamton, amid other towers for local TV and FM stations.

History
From its start, it was an AC station, but at first it played soft adult contemporary music. It was owned by local business people.

In 1997, it was bought by Majac of Michigan, Inc.  Majac kept the AC format.  In 2000, it was acquired by Clear Channel Communications, which also left its AC format in place.  Clear Channel in 2014 became iHeartMedia, the current owner.

References

External links

MXW
IHeartMedia radio stations
Radio stations established in 1989
1989 establishments in New York (state)